Moomal Khalid is a Pakistani TV actress and model. She began her showbiz profession with displaying and then began acting. Moomal Khalid was born in Pakistan.

Her Father Name Is Khalid Chandio. He Works In Suparco.

Car crash and demise of her friend

Young Pakistani model and television actress Moomal Khalid got severely injured in a car crash that killed her friend on 20 January 2015 but  Moomal escaped death and she started working in the industry again.

The two were driving to the airport  when they got up with an unfortunate crash. The young actress’ car had a severe collision with another vehicle that killed her friend who was driving the car.

Career

Her introduction show was Khudgharz for GEO TV with Sumbul Iqbal, Ushna Shah, and Agha. Her drama list include:

Television

Modeling

Khalid has also been brand ambassador for Pakistani top brands, Cherry Wrap & Ego. She is also brand ambassador Nivia Beauty Cream, Omore, Pak Fans, Samsol Hair Colour

Personal life
She married actor Usman Patel in 2017. She has a son born in 2020.

References

Living people
Actresses from Karachi
Year of birth missing (living people)